Kwaan Yoong Jing (born 13 July 1990) is a Malaysian professional basketball player.  He currently plays for Westports Malaysia Dragons of the ASEAN Basketball League.

He represented Malaysia's national basketball team at the 2015 FIBA Asia Championship in Changsha, China where he was his team's best shot blocker.

References

External links
 Asia-basket.com Profile
 ASEAN Basketball League Profile
 FIBA.com Profile

1990 births
Living people
Centers (basketball)
Malaysian men's basketball players
Sportspeople from Kuala Lumpur
Kuala Lumpur Dragons players